Pristimantis xestus is a species of frog in the family Strabomantidae.
It is endemic to Colombia.
Its natural habitat is tropical high-altitude grassland.

References

xestus
Frogs of South America
Amphibians of Colombia
Endemic fauna of Colombia
Amphibians described in 1995
Taxonomy articles created by Polbot